The 1978 CECAFA Cup was the 6th edition of the tournament. It was held in Malawi, and was won by the hosts. The matches were played between November 1 and 19.

Group stage

Semi-finals

Third place match

Final

References
Rsssf archives

CECAFA Cup
CECAFA